Masteria is a genus of curtain web spiders that was first described by L. Koch in 1873. They occur in the tropics of Central to South America, Asia and Micronesia, with one species found in Australia. M. lewisi, M. barona, and M. downeyi are slightly smaller and have only six eyes.

Species

 it contains 39 species:
Masteria aguaruna Passanha & Brescovit, 2018 – Peru
Masteria aimeae (Alayón, 1995) – Cuba
Masteria amarumayu Passanha & Brescovit, 2018 – Brazil
Masteria angienae Víquez, 2020 — Costa Rica (Cocos Is.)
Masteria barona (Chickering, 1966) – Trinidad
Masteria caeca (Simon, 1892) – Philippines
Masteria cavicola (Simon, 1892) – Philippines
Masteria chalupas (Dupérré & Tapia, 2021) — Ecuador
Masteria colombiensis Raven, 1981 – Colombia
Masteria downeyi (Chickering, 1966) – Costa Rica, Panama
Masteria franzi Raven, 1991 – New Caledonia
Masteria galipote Passanha & Brescovit, 2018 – Dominican Rep.
Masteria golovatchi Alayón, 1995 – Cuba
Masteria guyanensis Almeida, Salvatierra & de Morais, 2018 – Guyana
Masteria hirsuta L. Koch, 1873 (type) – Fiji, Micronesia
Masteria jatunsacha (Dupérré & Tapia, 2021) — Ecuador
Masteria kaltenbachi Raven, 1991 – New Caledonia
Masteria lasdamas (Dupérré & Tapia, 2021) — Ecuador
Masteria lewisi (Chickering, 1964) – Jamaica
Masteria lucifuga (Simon, 1889) – Venezuela
Masteria macgregori (Rainbow, 1898) – New Guinea
Masteria machay (Dupérré & Tapia, 2021) — Ecuador
Masteria manauara Bertani, Cruz & Oliveira, 2013 – Brazil
Masteria modesta (Simon, 1892) – St. Vincent
Masteria mutum Passanha & Brescovit, 2018 – Brazil
Masteria otongachi (Dupérré & Tapia, 2021) — Ecuador
Masteria pallida (Kulczyński, 1908) – New Guinea
Masteria papallacta (Dupérré & Tapia, 2021) — Ecuador
Masteria pasochoa (Dupérré & Tapia, 2021) — Ecuador
Masteria pecki Gertsch, 1982 – Jamaica
Masteria petrunkevitchi (Chickering, 1964) – Puerto Rico
Masteria sabrinae Passanha & Brescovit, 2018 – Martinique
Masteria simla (Chickering, 1966) – Trinidad
Masteria soucouyant Passanha & Brescovit, 2018 – Trinidad and Tobago
Masteria spinosa (Petrunkevitch, 1925) – Panama
Masteria tayrona Passanha & Brescovit, 2018 – Colombia
Masteria toddae Raven, 1979 – Australia (Queensland)
Masteria urdujae Rasalan & Barrion-Dupo, 2019 – Philippines (Luzon)
Masteria yacambu Passanha & Brescovit, 2018 – Venezuela

References

External links

Dipluridae
Mygalomorphae genera